Marius Cătălin Pahonțu (born 22 August 1999) is a Romanian professional footballer who plays as a midfielder for Liga III side CS Blejoi.

Honours
Turris Turnu Măgurele
Liga III: Winner 2018–19

References

External links
 
 

1999 births
Living people
Sportspeople from Ploiești
Romanian footballers
Association football midfielders
Liga I players
Liga II players
Liga III players
FC Astra Giurgiu players
AFC Turris-Oltul Turnu Măgurele players